Below is a list of RC Strasbourg Alsace's seasons since the club creation in 1906.

Season per season detail

Key

Pts = Points
Pld = Matches played
W = Matches won
D = Matches drawn
L = Matches lost
GF = Goals for
GA = Goals against
GD = Goal difference

L1/D1 = Ligue 1
L2/D2 = Ligue 2
CN = Championnat National
CdFA = Championnat de France Amateur
Ch Alsace = Alsace regional championship
Ch Dordogne = Dordogne championship
SFV Div B/C = Süddeutscher Fussball Verband Division B/C
UCL = UEFA Champions League
EC = European Cup
CWC = UEFA Cup Winners' Cup
UEL = UEFA Europa League
UC = UEFA Cup
UIC = UEFA Intertoto Cup
ICFC = Inter-Cities Fairs Cup

Total
As of 20 July 2008.

References

External links
  Player and Club Stats on racingstub.com.
  Ligue 1 stats on pari-et-gagne.com.
  Player stats on national-football-teams.com.
  Alsace Championship rankings 1919–1932 on rsssf.com.
  Gauligen archives on f-archiv.de. (seasons 1940–41, 1941–42, 1942–43, 1943–44, 1944–45)

Seasons
 
Strasbourg